Rafael Dolnick Sorkin (born c. 1945) is an American physicist. He is professor emeritus of physics at Syracuse University and the Perimeter Institute for Theoretical Physics, and a Fellow of the American Physical Society. He is best known as initiator and main proponent of the causal sets approach to quantum gravity.

Biography
Sorkin grew up in Chicago, Illinois, and was educated at the New Trier Township High School (valedictorian, 1963), Harvard University (A.B., Summa Cum Laude, Phi Beta Kappa, 1966), and California Institute of Technology (Ph.D., 1974). He is the son of the American violinist Leonard Sorkin.

Research interests
Sorkin believes that the successful solution of quantum gravity will involve both a reevaluation of gravity in terms of a discrete structure underlying continuous spacetime, and also a reformulation of quantum mechanics. He also hypothesises that the phenomena of topology change and the thermodynamics of the black hole structure provide important clues to the formation of the final synthesis. In this framework he has examined the quantum properties of topological geons (particles created directly from the spacetime topology). His findings include that the topological geons can exhibit remarkable statistical properties. He also discovered evidence that topology change is a required feature of any consistent quantum gravity theory. He has hunted the origin of a black hole's entropy to discover more about how it relates to the synthesis of quantum mechanics and the theory of general relativity.

He also introduced anhomomorphic logic, a new interpretation of quantum theory.

See also

 Causal sets

External links
 Sorkin's homepage at the Perimeter Institute
 Sorkin's preprints at arXiv
 Geometry from order: causal sets
 Non-technical text by Sorkin on Einstein Online.

Living people
Year of birth missing (living people)
Theoretical physicists
21st-century American physicists
New Trier High School alumni
Harvard University alumni
California Institute of Technology alumni
Fellows of the American Physical Society
Syracuse University faculty